Maria Kihl or Mia Kihl (born April 23, 1979 in Stockholm), is a Swedish voice actress.

Roles 
The Fairly OddParents - Vicky (Starting from Season 2).
Goof Troop - Max.
Quack Pack - Louie.
TaleSpin - Molly Cunningham (1st Voice), Additional Voices.
Total Drama Island - Sadie.
Yu-Gi-Oh! - Anzu Mazaki
Winx Club - Flora
Fuller House - Kimmy Gibbler.

External links 
 Mia Kihl at Svensk Filmdatabases

1979 births
Living people
Actresses from Stockholm
Swedish voice actresses